The Lexicon of Love is the debut studio album by English pop band ABC. It was released on 21 June 1982 by Neutron Records in the United Kingdom, by Mercury Records in the United States and Japan, and by Vertigo Records in Canada and Europe. The album entered the UK Albums Chart at number one and has been certified platinum by the British Phonographic Industry (BPI) and gold by the Recording Industry Association of America (RIAA). It features four UK top 20 singles; "Tears Are Not Enough", "Poison Arrow", "The Look of Love" and "All of My Heart".

Though Martin Fry has declined to label it a concept album, the album features repeated themes in which the singer experiences heartache as he tries and fails to have a meaningful relationship. A longform music video and film, Mantrap, featuring songs from the album was released in 1983.

Background
The Lexicon of Love was ABC's debut studio album. The band had formed a few years earlier as electronic band Vice Versa and released their first single as ABC "Tears Are Not Enough" in 1981.

The songs on the album were written collectively by the band, with arranger Anne Dudley given songwriting credits on some tracks. Martin Fry said that the band's ambition was to fuse punk and disco, music that was more sophisticated but still had some attitude. Lyrically, the songs are all about the matters of the heart. "Most of the other people were writing about electric pylons. We wanted to hark back to Cole Porter and his ilk, but in a very modern way", Fry said. The title The Lexicon of Love originated from a headline of a live review of ABC in NME.

Recording and release dates
The majority of the album was recorded at Sarm East Studios in London, as well as at Abbey Road Studios, Townhouse Studios, RAK Studios and Good Earth Studios. The production includes both orchestral arrangements and the use of the then latest technology.

The album was produced by Trevor Horn, engineered by Gary Langan and features orchestrations by Anne Dudley and Fairlight CMI programming by J. J. Jeczalik; Horn, Langan, Dudley and Jeczalik would later form the Art of Noise a year after the release of this album. Indeed, most of the production team and session musicians on the album would form the basis for the ZTT label, and their work with Horn meant all concerned would be in constant demand throughout the industry in years to come. The cover photograph is by Gered Mankowitz.

"Tears Are Not Enough" (in its initial release produced by Steve Brown), "All of My Heart", "Poison Arrow" and "The Look of Love (Part One)" were all top-20 entries in the UK; the latter two also charted in the US, peaking at No. 25 and No. 18, respectively. The album reached No. 1 on the UK charts and peaked at No. 24 in the US charts.

The album was followed by a tour with the band extended to an 11-piece onstage, reaching Europe, USA and Japan. The shows at Hammersmith Odeon in November 1982 were recorded for inclusion in ABC's forthcoming film Mantrap.

In 2004, a two-disc deluxe reissue including previously unreleased outtakes and early demos and a live performance of the album from 1982 was released by Neutron Records.

In 2009, ABC (with Fry as its sole member) performed the entire album at the Royal Albert Hall in London, accompanied by the BBC Concert Orchestra and conducted by arranger and composer Anne Dudley. They were joined onstage by the album's producer Trevor Horn.

The Lexicon of Love was again performed live in its entirety on 18 December 2012 at Theatre Royal, Drury Lane. This marked the 30th anniversary of the album's release and once again featured Dudley as conductor, performing with the Southbank Sinfonia Orchestra. The same line-up (with Dudley and Southbank Sinfonia) concluded a four-date mini-tour at this same venue on 30 March 2014 performing the album in its entirety. Martin Fry and band were once more accompanied by the Southbank Sinfonia Orchestra for dates at Liverpool's Philharmonic Hall, Glasgow Royal Concert Hall, Sheffield City Hall, the Theatre Royal, Drury Lane in London and Symphony Hall, Birmingham, between November 4 and 9, 2015.

A sequel studio album The Lexicon of Love II was released on 27 May 2016.

Critical reception

The album entered the UK Albums Chart at number 1 and remained on the charts for 50 weeks. It was the fourth biggest selling album in the UK in 1982.

From contemporary reviews, Mitchell Cohen of Creem declared the album to be a "piece of sumptuous kitsch" and that "the whole shebang is so florid, so exaggerated, so damned catchy – you want to hear "The Look of Love" a second time before it's even half over; it's a casserole of about forty different pop hits and advertising jingles – that you may feel guilty for falling for it." Don Waller of the Los Angeles Times praised the album, stating that producer Trevor Horn "deserves a share of the applause, but the songs — credited to all four ABC members — are the real deal: apocalyptic, widescreen romances with more hooks than a meat-packing plant." Waller proclaimed that "Tears Are Not Enough", "Poison Arrow" and "The Look of Love (Part I)"  call out for "any one of a dozen contemorary black vocalists" stating that "ABC's biggest drawback is Martin Fry's singing, which borders on the effete." Ken Tucker of The Philadelphia Inquirer gave the album a one star out of five rating stating that the album was "prissy dance music, light on the beat and heavy on the sort of maundering crooning that the effete English rock musicians frequently mistake for passion."

From retrospective reviews, AllMusic wrote: "The production style was dense and noisy, but frequently beautiful, and the group's emotional songs gave it a depth and coherence later Horn works (...) would lack." "Fry and company used the sound to create moving dancefloor epics like "Many Happy Returns," which, like most of the album's tracks, deserved to be a hit single."
In a review of the 2004 Deluxe Edition BBC stated that "The Lexicon of Love stands as a landmark album in British pop". Rob Webb wrote: "It underpins just what a sharp band ABC were: witty, lyrical and very, very funky (...) Each track is a love affair in miniature: some are touching ("All of My Heart", "Show Me"), others a bitter invective at misplaced passion ("Many Happy Returns"). There is more going on in "2 Gether 4 Ever" than many bands squeeze into an entire album (...) Dance music had rarely been so literate." Colin Larkin awarded the album 5 stars (outstanding) in The Encyclopedia of Popular Music stating: "Their pristine pop songs were nowhere better showcased than on the superb The Lexicon of Love. This Trevor Horn-produced album remains a benchmark of 80s pop, and a formidable collection of melodramatic love songs assembled in one neat package."

Track listing

2004 deluxe edition

Personnel
ABC
 Martin Fry – lead and backing vocals
 Mark White – keyboards, guitars, backing vocals (6)
 Stephen Singleton – alto saxophone, tenor saxophone
 Mark Lickley – bass guitar (2, 4, 6)
 David Palmer – drums, Linn LM-1 programming, percussion
 David Robinson – drums on single/demo versions of "Tears Are Not Enough"

Additional personnel
 Anne Dudley – keyboards, orchestrations
 J. J. Jeczalik – Fairlight CMI programming
 Brad Lang – bass guitar
 Luís Jardim (misspelled as "Louis Jardin" on album notes) – additional percussion
 Andy Gray – trombone (4)
 Kim Wear – trumpet
 John Thirkell – trumpet (2, 6), flugelhorn (2, 6)
 Gaynor Sadler – harp
 Karen Clayton – female speaking voice (2)
 Tessa Webb – female lead vocal (7)

Production and artwork
 Trevor Horn – producer
 Gary Langan – engineer
 Howard Gray – assistant engineer 
 Gered Mankowitz – film photography
 Paul Cox – band photography
 Pete Bill – cover photography
 Visible Inc. – design
 Neutron Records – design

2004 deluxe edition credits
 Gary Moore – digital remastering
 Daryl Easlea – album coordinator, compiler
 Martin Fry – compiler
 Deluxe Graphics@Green Ink – artwork restoration, adaption

Charts

Weekly charts

Year-end charts

Certifications

References

Bibliography

External links

 The Lexicon of Love (Adobe Flash) at Radio3Net (streamed copy where licensed)
 

1982 debut albums
ABC (band) albums
Albums produced by Trevor Horn
Mercury Records albums
Vertigo Records albums